Linda Hallin (born 14 March 1996) is a Swedish football midfielder who plays for AIK in the Swedish Damallsvenskan.

Honours

Club 
KIF Örebro DFF
Runner-up
 Damallsvenskan: 2014

International 
Sweden U19
Winner
 UEFA Women's Under-19 Championship: 2015

External links 
 

1996 births
Living people
Swedish women's footballers
KIF Örebro DFF players
AIK Fotboll (women) players
Damallsvenskan players
Women's association football midfielders
Elitettan players